Alfa Future People Festival is an electronic music festival which is held in the Russian town Bolshoye Kozino nearby the city Nizhny Novgorod, every summer since 2014.

The festival was started in 2014 by genre Electronic dance music including Hardstyle, Trance and Dubstep.
In addition to the podiums there are multiple sports events that will be held at the festival territory like Volleyball, Yoga and Physical fitness, and other various outdoor activities.
Since 2019, a “Snow Edition” of the festival is planned to be held during winter/early spring, in Rosa Khutor ski resort, in smaller scale (with limited line up) but similarly merging both dance music and outdoor activities.

Line up by edition

See also
List of electronic music festivals
List of festivals in Russia

References
 clashmusic.com
 Source for line up at alfa.ru

External links

 Official site

Music festivals established in 2014
Electronic music festivals in Russia